This list of presidents of the American Society of Human Genetics includes all presidents since the Society's creation in 1948.

Presidents

References 
 

Genetics organizations
American Society of Human Genetics
Lists of presidents of organizations
Organizations established in 1948